The Deuce is an American period drama television series created by David Simon and George Pelecanos, set in New York in the 1970s (seasons 1 and 2) and in the 1980s (season 3). With an ensemble cast featuring James Franco, Maggie Gyllenhaal, Gbenga Akinnagbe, Chris Bauer, Lawrence Gilliard Jr. and Emily Meade, the series tells the story of the Golden Age of Porn.

Series overview

Episodes

Season 1 (2017)

Season 2 (2018)

Season 3 (2019)

References

External links
 
 

Lists of American drama television series episodes